Casearia albicans is a species of flowering plant in the family Salicaceae. It is a tree endemic to Peninsular Malaysia. It is threatened by habitat loss.

References

albicans
Endemic flora of Peninsular Malaysia
Trees of Peninsular Malaysia
Data deficient plants
Taxonomy articles created by Polbot